Cosmosoma caecum is a moth of the family Erebidae. It was described by George Hampson in 1898. It is found in Mexico, Costa Rica, Guatemala and Panama.

References

caecum
Moths described in 1898